The Magapit Bridge is suspension bridge spanning  that connects the east and west sides of the Cagayan River in  Lal-lo, Cagayan, Philippines. Opened in 1978, it carries Maharlika Highway, linking Barangays Bangag and Magapit in Lal-lo. The bridge was also named by the locals as the "Golden Gate of Cagayan". This bridge is one of the only two bridges in the province that runs across the mighty waterway of the Cagayan River.

The late Engr. Angel G. Villanueva was the project engineer of Magapit suspension bridge under IWCDC (owned by the Dys) and Japanese consultants.

Rehabilitation
The bridge undergone rehabilitation that started on May 16, 2012 and ended November 20, 2012. Traffic in that area were serviced by ferry boats in lieu of the rehabilitation.

References

Bridges in the Philippines
Buildings and structures in Cagayan